is an adult animated streaming television series created by Ezra Koenig of American rock band Vampire Weekend, and produced by Japanese anime studios Production I.G. and Studio Deen. The first season, consisting of six episodes, premiered on Netflix on September 22, 2017. The Christmas special Neo Yokio: Pink Christmas was released on December 7, 2018.

Plot
Netflix's press release describes Neo Yokio as the "greatest city in the world", a modern-day alternate timeline New York where Magicians saved the city from ruin by demons in the 19th century, gaining a place in the upper echelons of society and becoming known as "Magistocrats". The series revolves around Kaz Kaan (Jaden Smith), a vain and wealthy Magistocrat and his mecha butler Charles (Jude Law), as he balances a vapid and decadent life as a fashionista in the city with his demon-hunting duties managed by his stern Aunt Agatha (Susan Sarandon).

Kaz has taken to self-pity and "melancholy" after his recent break-up with investment banker Cathy (Alexa Chung) and only wishes to live a life of luxury with his socialite friends Lexy (The Kid Mero) and Gottlieb (Desus Nice). His rival is Arcangelo (Jason Schwartzman), an old money scion who belittles Kaz's "Neo riche" status, and the two are often in competition for the top spot on the Bachelor's List, a gigantic public billboard of Neo Yokio's most eligible bachelors. Former fashion blogger Helena St. Tessero (Tavi Gevinson) becomes re-acquainted with Kaz in the first episode after he performs an exorcism on a possessed Chanel suit. However, the possession leaves Helena disillusioned with Neo Yokio and the capitalist system, eventually leading her to become a hikikomori, an anti-capitalist critic and a foil to Kaz's vapid focus on fashion and social status.

Cast

Production
Neo Yokio was originally announced, without a title, at Production I.G.'s panel at Anime Expo in 2015. The series was originally intended to run as part of Fox's Animation Domination High-Def late night block, which had just transitioned from the Fox network to sister cable network FXX earlier that year. No further details about the series were announced in the months following, and Animation Domination High-Def ceased operations in 2016.

While the writing and post-production were done in the United States, the character design, pre-production and storyboards were created in Japan and much of the animation was carried out in South Korea.

Moved to Netflix
On September 7, 2017, Netflix announced they had acquired the unaired Neo Yokio series to stream on their service, labeling it as a Netflix Original Series.

Episodes

Season 1 (2017)

Christmas Special (2018)

On October 9, 2018, Netflix announced that a Neo Yokio Christmas special would be released on December 7, 2018. Trailers were released in October 2018, in November 2018, and on December 3, 2018. It was released on December 7, 2018 as an hour-long special titled Neo Yokio: Pink Christmas.

Neo Yokio: Pink Christmas features Kaz Kaan, who must defeat a giant sentient Christmas tree threatening the city of Neo Yokio. He also has to handle a Secret Santa competition, a visit by his Aunt Angelique, and plotting from Arcangelo. The special includes Jamie Foxx as a voice actor, while recurring characters are voiced by Jaden Smith, Susan Sarandon, Jude Law, and Jason Schwartzman. Pink Christmas includes an original new song by Koenig, "Friend Like You". It appears several times in the episode, and at the time of the premiere, had not appeared as a song elsewhere or for download.

Reception
The series received mixed reviews, with a common criticism being the main character Kaz Kaan. Mike Toole from Anime News Network called the show "nigh-unwatchable codswallop", expressing issues with the bad voice acting of its cast, and with its poor animation and writing. Julia Alexander of Polygon called the show a poor attempt to bring Jaden Smith's Twitter persona into a series as Jaden's character Kaz is annoying, self-centered, narcissistic and infuriating rather than likable.

IGN gave it a negative review, with reviewer Miranda Sanchez criticizing the artwork, calling it humorless, and saying that it "feigns sincerity in any serious issue it tackles". Dana Schwartz of Entertainment Weekly gave the first season a positive review, saying it was "both deeply ironic and entirely deadpan and we should be so grateful that this vanity-project-cum-genius-conceptional-art-piece somehow exists in the real world".

Among the more positive reviews was Clio Chang's in The New Republic, who described Smith's performance as "exquisitely deadpan [..] that serves to heighten his detached snobbery" and that Neo Yokio "mostly feels like an introduction to what could be a really groundbreaking show", while also calling out its "cringe-worthy moments". Mike Hale of The New York Times praised the show's satire, stating, "The show derives a lot of its humor from Kaz's earnest attempts to belong, which occasion some reasonably subtle mockery of the city's social stratification and of a certain strain of tragic millennial mopiness", while noting, "if [watchers don't stick around], it may be because they find the humor too precious." Ryan F. Mandelbaum at Gizmodo compared the show to "a six episode long dril tweet" and "Gossip Girl as told by a stoned Tim and Eric fan", praising its surreal humor and finding the show's depiction of contemporary urban life "far closer to reality—albeit a ridiculous one—than its premise may suggest".

References

Notes

External links
 
 

2010s American adult animated television series
2010s American satirical television series
2010s American comic science fiction television series
2010s American black cartoons
2017 American television series debuts
2018 American television series endings
2017 Japanese television series debuts
2018 Japanese television series endings
American adult animated comedy television series
American adult animated science fiction television series
American adult animated fantasy television series
American animated science fantasy television series
Anime-influenced Western animated television series
English-language Netflix original programming
Japanese adult animated comedy television series
Japanese adult animated science fiction television series
Japanese adult animated fantasy television series
Production I.G
Satire anime and manga
Studio Deen
Television series by 20th Century Fox Television
Television series by Fox Television Animation